Judea Lyaboloma Constituency is an Electoral district in Namibia. It is situated in the Zambezi Region. Its centre is Sangwali which is a settlement 129.3 kilometres out of Katima Mulilo. The constituency has a population of 5,511 people. In the 2020 Regional Council Elections, there were 3,339 registered voters.

The constituency was created in August 2013 from the western part of Linyanti Constituency, following a recommendation of the Fourth Delimitation Commission of Namibia, and in preparation of the 2014 general election. It is named after Judea Lyaboloma, a former People's Liberation Army of Namibia (PLAN) guerrilla and Medal of Bravery recipient.

Politics
The 2015 regional election was won by Beaven Bashole Munali of the SWAPO Party with 1,078 votes, followed by Oscar Zambo Munanzi of the Rally for Democracy and Progress (RDP) with 120 votes. In the 2020 regional election an independent candidate won the constituency. Gwelu Humphrey Divai obtained 1,250 votes, ahead of Vincent Bafeze Sinalumbu, the SWAPO candidate, who got 722 votes.

See also
 Administrative divisions of Namibia

References

Constituencies of Zambezi Region
States and territories established in 2013
2013 establishments in Namibia